Johnny Zhang Junning (born March 22, 1985) is a Chinese actor and singer. He made his acting debut in the Chinese television drama, Five Star Hotel (2007), and achieved popularity in China.

Life and career 
Zhang was born and raised in Nanjing, Jiangsu, China. He graduated from Shanghai Theatre Academy. He made his acting debut in the Chinese television drama, Five Star Hotel in 2007. His debut EP, Xiao Fei Xia was released in 2008.
In 2011, he appeared in the Taiwanese television drama, Sunny Girl, which helped him gain recognition in Taiwan.
In 2017, he co-starred in the Chinese fantasy television series, Fighter of the Destiny.

Filmography

Film

Television series

Variety and reality show

Discography

Extended plays

Singles

Awards

References

External links 

1985 births
Living people
Shanghai Theatre Academy alumni
Male actors from Nanjing
Singers from Nanjing
Chinese male television actors
Chinese male film actors
Chinese male stage actors
Chinese Mandopop singers
21st-century Chinese male actors
21st-century Chinese male singers